Youngblood, Youngbloods or Young Blood may refer to:

Film and television 
 Young Blood (1926 film), a German silent drama film
 Young Blood (1932 film), an American western film
 Young Blood (1943 film), a Swedish drama film
 Youngblood (1978 film), an American film starring Lawrence Hilton-Jacobs
 Youngblood (1986 film), an American film starring Rob Lowe
 "Youngblood" (CSI: NY episode)
 "Young Bloods" (Falling Skies), an episode of Falling Skies
Young Blood (TV series), a 2019 Chinese television series

Music

Artists 
 Youngblood (band), a Swedish boy band
 The Youngbloods, an American psychedelic rock band from the 1960s
 Youngblood Brass Band, a New Orleans band
 YoungBloodZ, an American hip-hop group
 Young Blood, a British 1960s group including Cozy Powell
 Yungblud, a British singer-songwriter
 Sydney Youngblood, an American singer
 Thomas Youngblood, an American guitarist and founding member of Kamelot

Albums 
 Youngbloods (album), a 2010 album by The Amity Affliction 
 The Young Bloods, a 1956 album by Donald Byrd
 Youngblood (5 Seconds of Summer album) (2018)
 Youngblood (Audrey Horne album) (2013)
 Youngblood (Elvin Jones album) (1992)
 Young Blood (album), a 1985 album by Jerry Lee Lewis
 Youngblood (Jon Faddis album) (1976)
 Young Blood (EP), a 2014 EP by Bea Miller
 Youngblood (Carl Wilson album) (1983)
 The Youngbloods (album), a 1967 album by the Youngbloods
 Yungblud (album), self-titled album, 2022
 Young Blood, a 1981 album by Alkatrazz
 Youngblood (Original Motion Picture Soundtrack), a 1978 album by War

Songs 
 "Young Bloods" (the Bronx song)
 "Youngbloods" (The Amity Affliction song)
 "Young Blood" (Coasters song) (1957)
 "Youngblood" (E.M.D. song) (2009)
 "Young Blood" (Sophie Ellis-Bextor song) (2013)
 "Youngblood" (5 Seconds of Summer song) (2018)
 "Young Blood" (Norah Jones song)
 "Young Blood" (Bea Miller song)
 "Young Blood" (The Naked and Famous song) (2010)
 "Youngblood" (Youngblood song) (2012)
 "Youngbloods", a 2013 song by Blessthefall from Hollow Bodies
 "Youngblood" a 2013 song by Glasvegas from Later...When the TV Turns to Static
 "Youngblood", a song by Green Day from Revolution Radio
 "Youngblood", a song by 3OH!3 from Omens

Other 
 Youngblood (comics), a comic book and the fictional title team
 Young Blood (novel) or Darkest Hour, a Mediator novel 
 Young Bloods (novel), a historical novel by Simon Scarrow
 Wolfenstein: Youngblood, a 2019 video game

People 
 Youngblood (surname), including a list of people with the name
 Alvin Youngblood Hart (born 1963), American musician
 Tim Chapman, nicknamed "Youngblood" (born 1965), American bounty hunter and reality television star

See also
 Young blood transfusion